Brand X with Russell Brand is an American late-night talk show, stand up comedy television series that premiered on FX on June 28, 2012, starring English comedian Russell Brand and created by Brand and Troy Miller.  Its second season concluded on May 2, 2013. On June 6, 2013, FX announced that Brand X would not be renewed for a third season.

Production

Season 1
For the first half of season 1 (2012), there weren't any guests, just an extended monologue with three loosely connected topics. Brand was accompanied on stage by his political analyst Matt Stoller in season 1. In later episodes, a celebrity guest appeared for two segments, the first of which was an interview and the second of which was Brand and the guest giving an audience member advice about a problem they asked about. In the second half of season 1, Brand added the segment "Totally Unacceptable Opinion", which featured people from hate groups such as the Westboro Baptist Church, and Brand argued with them about their controversial beliefs, then brought out some of the types of people whom they hate (for example, a group of homosexuals) for a debate.

Season 2
FX renewed the series on November 27 for a 13-episode second season, which began on February 7, 2013 and expanded to an hour-long format broadcast live. The "Totally Unacceptable Opinion" segment was dropped and Stoller was effectively replaced as sideman by Steve Jones, founding member and guitarist of the Sex Pistols. In addition to providing brief guitar accompaniment leading into and out of commercial breaks, Jonesy's punk credentials and congenial on-air manner from years as Los Angeles Indie 103 radio DJ/host proved a far better fit for occasional banter with fellow Brit Brand.

Cancellation
On June 6, 2013, FX announced that Brand X with Russell Brand would not be renewed for a third season. FX has reportedly picked up a scripted pilot starring Brand that will be loosely based on his life, similar to  Curb Your Enthusiasm.

Reception
The first episode gained largely negative reviews, with Mary McNamara of the Los Angeles Times commenting that, "If nothing else, Brand has overestimated his own ability to riff on the news, or rather the audience's interest in his riff. More experienced "talk show" stars, from Leno to Colbert, approach the half-hour with a bit more humility; they do not try to sustain it with monologue alone."

Tim Goodman of The Hollywood Reporter was more positive, although he found that the half-hour-long time slot was "constraining". According to Goodman, Brand X is "ostensibly an exercise in Brand riffing on the news" and is considered to be an attempt by Brand to bring his stand up comedy roots to a U.S. audience.

References

External links
 

FX Networks original programming
2010s American late-night television series
2010s American stand-up comedy television series
2010s American television talk shows
2012 American television series debuts
2013 American television series endings
English-language television shows
Russell Brand